Somos tú y yo, known as Somos tú y yo: Un nuevo día for its final season, is a Venezuelan telenovela filmed in Caracas, Venezuela and developed by Boomerang Latin America and Venezuela television channel Venevisión the series starred Sheryl Rubio together with Víctor Drija.

Synopsis 
Somos tú y yo revolves around the students of The Academy, a school of performing arts, ambitions, talents and relationships. The heart of the story is the first love, and viewers follow the budding romance of young singers Victor Rodríguez (Victor Drija) and Sheryl Sánchez (Sheryl Rubio), whose friendship turns into true love in the midst of many setbacks.

The third season, subtitled Un nuevo día, directly adapts the events of Grease (1978), in which following his parents' deaths and with dreams of becoming an international rock star, Victor decides to move to the United States, promises his girlfriend Sheryl that he would always keep in touch with her; however, after not hearing from Victor for months, Sheryl decides to forget about him. Three years later, Victor returns to the country, but discovers that everything has changed when he sees that his old gang, "Los Tigres", has replaced him with Aran (Arán de las Casas) as leader, and that Sheryl has become the leader of a group of girls called "Las Reinas" and a "tough girl" who does not want to know anything about him.

Meanwhile, Victor reconnects with his best friend from his youth, who waited for him the whole time he was out of the country, tomboy Rosmeri Rivas (Rosmeri Marval), a mechanic for the Rodríguez family workshop who is secretly in love with him. With their new leader, Los Tigres goes from consisting of Jorge, Victor, Luciano and Ricardo to being Aran, Gustavo, Luciano, Jorge and Ricardo, all popular kids in the city. In addition, a new group named "The Artists", consisting of the rich children of The Academy, Andrés, Alejandro, Gabriel, Erick, Oriana, Yuvana and Claudia, are led by Hendrick Welles (Hendrick Bages), the star of the reality series The Hendrick Show. With this distraction, Arán attempts to seduce Sheryl, while Oriana Castillo (Oriana Ramírez), a rival television star to Hendrick, also falls in love with Víctor in addition to Rosemari and try to prevent him from winning her back.

Cast

Episodes

Production 
Somos tú y yo was a co-production between Boomerang and Venevisión. The series was transmitted in Latin America, Europe, Middle East and Asia. The series premiered on June 27, 2007 and its pilot episode had approximately 5.9 million viewers. The series had three successful seasons, one of the most successful series channel. We are you and I ended on November 13, 2008 and its final episode had an audience of about 9.8 million, the largest audience received by any final episode of a series of Boomerang Latin America.

The program was fully recorded in Caracas and surrounding areas. Places like Sheryl house have been recreated and instead of recording in outdoor places, was in a city park. The interior of The Academy, where boys study series singing and dancing, is located just outside Caracas and its facade is the Central University of Venezuela. Sheryl's house, actually, is located next to the Academy. The sets, which occupy about 1,500 square meters, is divided into two sections: the first is the home of Sheryl with a staircase leading to the upstairs bedrooms and the second section is created for the second season that this divides the room dance, singing and recording.

The series also being issued by Venevisión was also transmitted by air channels and cable in different countries of the world, why the series went beyond borders and got a great fanaticism around the world, being highlighted Italy and the Philippines. Some of the leading chains are, GMA Network, Univision and RAI, which was in charge of their respective emission zone.

After record-breaking audience in Latin America, Venevision International, the entertainment company part of the Cisneros Group, along with DVI Productions, it announced the adaptations localized for China, Indonesia and Malaysia.

Casting 
Sheryl Rubio was chosen by casting. The castings of the series lasted six months where the protagonist had to show her talents, in the area of singing, dancing and acting. The protagonist confessed that when she was selected in the series she had never taken acting classes, but she had made special appearances as a child actress in television. The actor Víctor Drija was invited to the casting, by the creator of the series Vladimir Pérez, the actor he introduced himself and obtained the main role of the series. While actress Rosmeri Marval, who plays Rosmery Rivas, was attending school in Caracas, her school's principal informed the students that there would be an audition; she decided to participate.

The producers of Venevisión and Boomerang made in the second season of the series an open casting for the public, to choose the actors for new characters. The actress Paola Galué appeared in the casting for the second season and was selected.

Spin-off

In August 2009, Boomerang announced that Vladimir Perez, the creator of Somos tú y yo: Un nuevo día, would be making a spin-off following the unprecedented worldwide success of the original series, which would cross over into a different genre, the sitcom, to bring their fans fresh adventures full of comedy and music, titled NPS: No puede ser. ICB It premiered on July 22, 2011.

References

External links 

Boomerang (TV network) original programming
Venevisión telenovelas
Venezuelan telenovelas
Spanish-language telenovelas
2007 Venezuelan television series debuts
2009 Venezuelan television series endings
2000s Venezuelan television series
2007 American television series debuts
2009 American television series endings
Spanish-language American telenovelas
Television series about teenagers